Lilia is a feminine given name. Notable people with the name include:

Lilia Abadjieva (born 1966), Bulgarian theatre director
Lilia al-Atrash (born 1977), Syrian actress
Lilia Amarfi (1949–2010), Soviet and Russian operetta actress
Lilia Biktagirova (born 1990), Russian figure skater
Lilia Bolocan (born 1972), Moldovan politician
Lilia Buckingham (born 2003), American Internet personality, actress, dancer, author, and producer
Lilia Carrillo (1930–1974), Mexican painter
Lilia Cuntapay (1935–2016), Filipina actress
Lilia Estrin Dallin (1898–1981), Russian Trotskyist
Lilia Dizon (1928–2020), Filipina actress
Lilia Gildeeva (born 1976), Russian television journalist
Lilia Gorilskaya (born 1988), Ukrainian handball player
Lilia Ignatova (born 1965), Bulgarian rhythmic gymnast
Lilia Izquierdo (born 1967), Cuban volleyball player
Lilia Kopylova (born 1978), Russian dancer
Lilia Luciano (born 1984), Puerto Rican television journalist
Lilia Maraviglia (born 1969), Bulgarian actress
Lilia Merodio Reza (born 1978), Mexican politician
Lilia Michel (1926–2011), Mexican actress
Lilia Osterloh (born 1978), American tennis player
Lilia Podkopayeva (born 1978), Ukrainian artistic gymnast
Lilia Prado (1928–2006), Mexican actress
Lilia Shevtsova, Soviet-American Kremlinology expert
Lilia Skala (1896–1994), Austrian actress
Lilia Vaygina-Efremova (born 1977), Ukrainian biathlete

Feminine given names
Given names derived from plants or flowers